Maria Grazia Spina (born 3 June 1936) is an Italian television, film and stage actress.

Life and career 
Born Maria Grazia Spinazzi in Venice, Spina debuted as an actress with the theatrical company Stabile di Trieste, then worked with the companies of Vittorio Gassman, Aroldo Tieri, Elisa Cegani, and Glauco Mauri. She also had a prolific film career, but despite a great number of appearances, especially in comedies and adventure films, she failed to emerge. Her television career was more rewarding, and she had the opportunities to star in roles of weight in successful TV-series. She hosted the 1965 edition of Sanremo Music Festival.

Partial filmography 

La vita degli altri (1957) - Luisa
Promesse di marinaio (1958)
 The Adventures of Nicholas Nickleby (1958, TV series) -  Maddalena Bray
Men and Noblemen (1959) - La ragazza dell'albergo
La cento chilometri (1959) - The Flute Player Friend of Elena
Juke box urli d'amore (1959)
The Cossacks (1960) - Alina
Call Girls of Rome (1960) - Silvana
Il peccato degli anni verdi (1960) - Giulia Giordani
Revenge of the Conquered (1961)
Ursus and the Tartar Princess (1961) - Amia
Pugni, pupe e marinai (1961) - Grazia
Zorro alla corte di Spagna (1962) - Consuelo
Kerim, Son of the Sheik (1962) - Laila
Tiger of the Seven Seas (1962) - Anna de Cordoba
The Black Duke (1963) - Ginevra Cavalcanti
Zorro and the Three Musketeers (1963) - Manuela
La donna degli altri è sempre più bella (1963) - Savina (segment "Bagnino Lover")
Samson and the Slave Queen (1963) - Isabella de Alazon
Il Successo (1963) - Diana
Hercules Against the Mongols (1963) - Ljuba
Toto vs. the Black Pirate (1964) - Isabella
Laissez tirer les tireurs (1964) - Corinne Martin
Queste pazze pazze donne (1964) - Santuzza - Turiddu's wife ('Siciliani a Milano')
Revolt of the Barbarians (1964) - Lydia
Le tardone (1964) - Barbara (episode "Un delitto quasi perfetto")
Highest Pressure (1965) - Presentatrice
Me, Me, Me... and the Others (1966) - Nicetta, Peppino's Niece
The Bible: In the Beginning... (1966) - Daughter of Lot
I 2 magnifici fresconi (1969) - Santuzza / Barbara
Fermate il mondo... voglio scendere! (1970) - (uncredited)
La calandria (1972) - Clizia - maid
Rugantino (1973) - Donna Marta Capitelli
La madama (1976)
 Tell Me You Do Everything for Me (1976) - Paola Signorini - Francesco's lover
Violent Naples (1976) - Gervasi's Wife
Il ritorno di Casanova (1980)

References

External links  

 
 

Italian film actresses
1936 births
Actors from Venice
Living people
Italian television actresses
Italian stage actresses
20th-century Italian actresses